Ray McManus is an American poet with three award-winning poetry collections. He is an associate professor of English at the University of South Carolina Sumter.

Life

McManus was born in Columbia, South Carolina.

He earned his M.F.A. in Poetry in 2000, and his Ph.D. in Rhetoric and Composition in 2006, at University of South Carolina where he studied under Kwame Dawes and Ed Madden. As a student, he won the 1997 Academy of American Poets Award at the University of South Carolina. In 2008, he joined the faculty at the University of South Carolina Sumter and is an associate professor of English.

Works

McManus's first book, Driving through the country before you are born won the 2006 SC First Book Prize in Poetry, was the winner of the South Carolina Poetry Prize, selected by Kate Daniels, and published with University of South Carolina Press. His second book, Red Dirt Jesus was selected for the Marick Press Poetry Prize in 2011. In 2014, his third collection, Punch. was named best book of poetry in North America published by an independent press in the 2015 Independent Publishers Book Award.

McManus has published poems in Natural Bridge, Cold Mountain Review, Crazyhorse, Nimrod, Ellipsis, Borderlands, The Recorder, Los Angeles Review, Jabberwock, Asheville Poetry Review, Yemassee, Waccamaw, Arkansas Review, The Pinch, Pea River Journal, Barely South Review, moonShine Review, Steel Toe Review, Hayden's Ferry Review, Blue Collar Review, Animal, Town Creek Poetry, Frank Martin Review, Jasper, and Apron Review. His work has been anthologies in Traffic Life, A Millennial Sampler of SC Poets, The Southern Poetry Anthology, Remaking Moby, Seeking Jonathan Green, A Sense of the Midlands, and Hard Lines: Rough South Poetry.

Publications

Awards

2006 South Carolina First Book Prize in Poetry—selected by Kate Daniels
2011 Marick Press Prize in Poetry—selected by Alicia Ostriker
2015 Independent Publisher Book Award -- National

References

Links
 Southern Literary Review
 Steel Toe Review
 Town Creek Poetry
 Ray McManus Homepage
 Creative Writing at Tri-District Arts Consortium
 Animal: A Beast of a Literary Journal
 Joe Milford Poetry Show 1 of 2
 Joe Milford Poetry Show 2 of 2

University of South Carolina faculty
Poets from South Carolina
American male poets
1972 births
Living people
21st-century American poets
Writers from Columbia, South Carolina
21st-century American male writers